Salford North was a parliamentary constituency in the City of Salford in Greater Manchester from 1885 until 1950. It returned one Member of Parliament (MP)  to the House of Commons of the Parliament of the United Kingdom.

History
The constituency was created for the 1885 general election by the Redistribution of Seats Act 1885, which split the two-member Salford constituency into three divisions: Salford North, Salford South and Salford West. It was abolished for the 1950 general election.

Boundaries
1885–1918: The Municipal Borough of Salford wards of Greenage, Kersal, St John's, St Matthias, and Trinity.

1918–1950: The County Borough of Salford wards of Albert Park, Charlestown, Grosvenor, Kersal, and St Matthias.

Members of Parliament

Elections

Elections in the 1880s

Elections in the 1890s

Elections in the 1900s

Elections in the 1910s 

General Election 1914–15:

Another General Election was required to take place before the end of 1915. The political parties had been making preparations for an election to take place and by the July 1914, the following candidates had been selected; 
Liberal: William Pollard Byles
Unionist: Cyril Charlie Hamilton Potter
Labour: Benjamin Tillett

Elections in the 1920s

Elections in the 1930s

Election in the 1940s

References
Notes

Further reading

External links

Parliamentary constituencies in North West England (historic)
Constituencies of the Parliament of the United Kingdom established in 1885
Constituencies of the Parliament of the United Kingdom disestablished in 1950
Politics of Salford